The 1978 Chattanooga Moccasins football team represented the University of Tennessee at Chattanooga in the 1978 NCAA Division I-A football season. The Moccasins were led by first-year head coach Joe Morrison and played their home games at Charmerlain Field.  They finished the season 7–3–1 overall and 3–1 in Southern Conference (SoCon) play to finish tied for first place.

Schedule

References

Chattanooga
Chattanooga Mocs football seasons
Southern Conference football champion seasons
Chattanooga Moccasins football